Zagreb Film is a Croatian film company principally known for its animation studio. From Zagreb, it was founded in 1953. They have produced hundreds of animated films, as well as documentaries, television commercials, educational films and several feature films.

Zagreb Film produced the cartoon series Professor Balthazar, created by Zlatko Grgić, about an amusing professor who solved various imaginative problems. Another popular cartoon of theirs was Inspector Mask.

History

Zagreb Film was founded in 1953 with the main profile of an animated films production company. Since then, more than 600 animated films, 14 feature films, about 600 documentaries and 800 commercials as well as 600 educational films were produced in this studio.

The company operates at three locations; one with ateliers for artists, shooting equipment, small theater and one with film warehouse, video multiplication room and administration. The third location is used for commercial purposes.  During all these years, Zagreb Film received more than 400 awards on Festivals all over the world. Among them is the Academy Award - Oscar for the best animated short film in 1962 where Dušan Vukotić had become the first European animator to win the Oscar award for Surogat (Ersatz). Wealth of genres and different styles that were growing in Zagreb was the reason for Georges Sadoul, the French film theorist, critic and historian to coin the term Zagreb school of animation, what became the trademark for top grade and innovative animated films made in Zagreb.  Besides artistic films Zagreb film produced films and TV series like Inspektor Maska, Professor Balthazar, The Little Flying Bears and Maxi Cat. Most of these films were distributed internationally. The biggest global success was with the famous character of Professor Balthazar.

Works

Animated TV series

1960s
Inspektor Maska (1962–1963)
Professor Balthazar (1967–1978)

1970s
Adam (1970)
Maxi Cat (1971–1973)
Ptica i crvek (1978–1984)

Animated shorts
Cow on the Moon (1959) 
Piccolo (1959) 
Surogat (1961) - 1961 Academy Award winner 
Don Kihot
The Game (1963) - Academy Award nominee 
The Wall (1966) 
Curiosity (1967)
The Fly (1968)  
Tup Tup (1972) - Academy Award nominee 
The Diary (1974) 
Satiemania (1978) 
Fisheye (1980) 
 Big Time (1990)

Co-productions
The Little Flying Bears (1990), co-production with CineGroup
Dream Doll (1979), co-production with Bob Godfrey Films and Halas and Batchelor (Oscar nominee) 
Man: The Polluter (1973), co-production with the National Film Board of Canada

Compilations of Zagreb animation
 The Best of Zagreb Film: Be Careful What You Wish For/The Classic Collection (2000)

See also
Zagreb School of Animated Films
Pannonia Film Studio
United Productions of America

References

External links
 

The Best of Zagreb Film-Rembrandt Films
 

Film production companies of Croatia
Companies based in Zagreb
Croatian animation studios
Croatian animation
Mass media in Zagreb
Mass media companies established in 1953
1953 establishments in Croatia
Croatian brands